The Uxendon Shooting School Club was a club devoted to shooting sports located in Preston, in what is now the borough of Brent in London, England. It was between the Wealdstone Brook and Barn Hill, roughly where Alverstone Road is now. It hosted the trap shooting events for the 1908 Summer Olympics.

References
British History of the 1908 Summer Olympics. - accessed 8 July 2010.
1908 Summer Olympics official report. p. 39. - accessed 8 July 2010.
South Kenton and Preston Park Residents Association area information. - accessed 8 July 2010.

External links
 The 1908 Olympic Games in Brent - includes map and description

Venues of the 1908 Summer Olympics
Olympic shooting venues
Sports venues in London